The Fifth Development Cabinet was the Indonesian Cabinet which served under President Suharto and Vice President Sudharmono from March 1988 until March 1993. It was formed after Suharto was elected to a 5th term as president by the People's Consultative Assembly (MPR).

The Five Cabinet Aims
Continuing, intensifying, deepening, and expanding the execution of National Development as an implementation of Pancasila with the Development Trilogy and National Resilience as its foundation.
Improving National Discipline with a State Apparatus as its pioneers and aiming towards a clean and legitimate Government.
Institutionalizing Pancasila, Pancasila Democracy, and the Guide to Learn and Apply Pancasila (P4) in daily life as a community, state, and nation.
Executing a free and active foreign policy for the National interest.
Holding a direct, universal, free, and secret Legislative Elections in 1992.

President and Vice President

Susunan Kabinet Pembangunan V adalah sebagai berikut:

Coordinating Ministers

Departmental Ministers

State Ministers
State Minister/State Secretary: Brig. Gen. Murdiono
State Minister of National Development Planning/Chairman of the National Development Planning Body (BAPPENAS): Saleh Afiff
State Minister of Research and Technology/Chairman of the Research and Implementation of Technology (BPPT): B. J. Habibie
State Minister of Population and Environment: Emil Salim
State Minister of Housing: Siswono Yudo Husodo
State Minister of Youth and Sports: Akbar Tanjung
State Minister of State Apparatus Utilization: Sarwono Kusumaatmaja
State Minister of Female Empowerment: Sulaiskin Murpratomo

Junior Ministers
Junior Minister/Cabinet Secretary: Saadilah Mursyid
Junior Minister of Finance: Nasrudin Sumintapura
Junior Minister of Trade: Sudrajat Djiwandono
Junior Minister of Industry: Tungky Ariwibowo
Junior Minister of Agriculture: Sjarifuddin Baharsjah
Junior Minister of National Development Planning/Vice Chairman of BAPPENAS: B. S. Muljana

Official With Ministerial Rank
Commander of ABRI: Gen. Try Sutrisno
Attorney General: Sukarton Marmosudjono
Governor of the Central Bank: Adrianus Mooy

Changes
1991: Sukarton Marmosudjono died and was replaced as Attorney General by Singgih.
February 1993: Try Sutrisno was replaced as ABRI Commander by General Edi Sudrajat

References

Notes

New Order (Indonesia)
Cabinets of Indonesia
1988 establishments in Indonesia
1993 disestablishments in Indonesia
Cabinets established in 1988
Cabinets disestablished in 1993
Suharto